Michael Jeremy Pugh Davies CBE RIBA FRSA FRGS FICPD (born 25 January 1942) is an English  architect. He was a founding partner of the Richard Rogers Partnership and a senior partner of the firm's current incarnation, RSHP.

He is well known for always dressing from head to toe in red.

Early life and education
Mike Davies was born in England in 1942. His father was a geographer, and he travelled extensively with him as a child. He was educated at Highgate School, the Northern Polytechnic and the Architectural Association School of Architecture in London, before graduating with a master's degree in urban design from UCLA in 1970.

Career
Mike Davies started his career at Airstructures Design in London while studying at the Architectural Association. Following his master's degree at UCLA he co-founded Chrysalis Architects in the USA, a firm specialising in lightweight structures. He joined the partnership between Richard Rogers and Renzo Piano in 1971, shortly after they won the commission to design the Pompidou Centre in Paris, and later went on to become one of the founding directors of the Richard Rogers Partnership in 1977. He has worked with the firm ever since.

In 2010 he was appointed a Chevalier of the Order of the Légion d’honneur by French President Nicolas Sarkozy.

Rogers Stirk Harbour was reorganised in 2015 and Davies stepped down from his role as a partner in the company on 31 December 2015. He was to continue working for them in a part-time capacity.

Selected projects

Pompidou Centre, Paris
IRCAM (Institut de Recherche et Coordination Acoustique/Musique), Paris
Lloyd's Building, London
Millennium Dome, London
Heathrow Terminal 5, London

References

External links
Rogers Stirk Harbour + Partners website

1942 births
20th-century English architects
21st-century English architects
Alumni of the Architectural Association School of Architecture
Living people
People educated at Highgate School
Modernist architects from England
Commanders of the Order of the British Empire
Fellows of the Royal Geographical Society
Place of birth missing (living people)